"However Much I Booze" (Working title: "No Way Out") is a song by The Who, written by Pete Townshend that is the second track on their 1975 album The Who by Numbers.

Background

On stage, Townshend claimed that he wrote the song on the night that he gave up drinking. Lead singer Roger Daltrey refused to sing the song, possibly because (according to Richard Barnes) the song was too personal. Alternatively, it was speculated by authors Steve Grantley and Alan Parker that Daltrey wanted to make it clear that Townshend had the drinking problem, rather than himself.

Townshend later said about his drinking with the Who:

The song, containing additional lyrics not seen in the final version, was originally demoed with the working title of "No Way Out." This version later appeared on Townshend's demo collection album, Scoop 3.

"However Much I Booze" addresses themes including loneliness, the illusion of reality within the entertainment world and Townshend's own feuding with Who lead singer Roger Daltrey. The song's cheerful melody contrasts with the grim subject matter. The melody is complemented with energetic playing from drummer Keith Moon and bassist John Entwistle, further contrasting the mood of the lyrics.

Live history
"However Much I Booze" was played sporadically during The Who's 1975 tour, making it one of the three songs from The Who by Numbers to be played at that time (although "Slip Kid" was attempted during the band's 1976 tour.) However, the song was abandoned following this tour.

References

1975 songs
The Who songs
Songs written by Pete Townshend
Song recordings produced by Glyn Johns
Pete Townshend songs
Songs about alcohol